The 1960 Washington gubernatorial election took place on November 8, 1960, between incumbent Democratic governor Albert Rosellini and State Superintendent of Public Instruction Lloyd J. Andrews, nominated by the Republican Party.

Rosellini was re-elected to a second term as Governor of Washington, in a close race with Andrews. The election was the first in Washington state history to feature televised gubernatorial debates.

Description and events

Republican challengers to incumbent Governor Rosellini began announcing their bids for the office in early 1960. State representative and Republican house minority leader Newman H. Clark of the 43rd district announced his bid on January 23 at a Republican Party committee meeting. State Superintendent of Public Instruction Lloyd J. Andrews announced his bid on March 1, promising to improve the fiscal outlook for Washington's public schools while also criticizing Rosellini for his heavy spending and creation of a large tax burden. Republican chairman William C. Goodloe was a favorite to run, but announced in May that he would not run in the election.

Rosellini announced his re-election bid on May 21, at a Democratic rally in Seattle's Civic Auditorium. Touting his accomplishments during his term in office, Rosellini promised to "continue the job of progress in the State of Washington." Two Democratic candidates, Snohomish writer John Patric and Tacoma used cars salesman Bruce M. Sigman, both entered the race in July to challenge Rosellini, but did not make much headway.

The Republican primary campaign, pitting Andrews and Clark, was described as "rigorous contest" between the two. Andrews centered his campaign on attacking Rosellini and his administration, while Clark criticized both Rosellini and Andrews for their fiscal positions and proposed tax hikes. Early polls put Andrews as the clear frontrunner in the Republican race, with strong support from his native Eastern Washington, leading Rosellini's campaign to begin attacking Andrews and his record in the state senate, sensing a close general election.

During the September 13 primary, Rosellini defeated Patric and Sigman with a landslide victory, while Andrews defeated Clark by a comfortable margin. High voter turnout for Andrews, and low turnout for Rosellini, led The Seattle Times to declare that Rosellini "faces trouble" in the general contest.

Two smaller parties, the Socialist Labor Party of America and Socialist Workers Party, also nominated candidates in the election.

On November 8, Rosellini defeated Andrews by a narrow margin of 17,865 votes (1.4 percent) in the general election, the smallest margin since the 1940 election. Rosellini, a Democrat, was re-elected despite Washington voters rejecting Democratic candidate John F. Kennedy in favor of Republican Richard M. Nixon in the concurrent presidential race. The initial returns led Andrews to delay conceding to Rosellini until November 17, after the final absentee ballots were tallied; Andrews had a brief lead in absentee ballots, but fell short of the margin needed to overtake Rosellini.

The Seattle Times noted similarities between the 1956 and 1960 elections, especially in the preliminary stages, with an early Republican frontrunner deterring strong opponents from entering the race, only to be defeated by Rosellini.

Debates

The 1960 election featured the first televised debates in Washington gubernatorial history. KING-TV, based in Seattle, broadcast two of the debates between Rosellini and Andrews along with sister stations KREM-TV in Spokane and KPQ-TV in Wenatchee. 

The first debate, on September 28, came two days after presidential candidates Richard M. Nixon and John F. Kennedy debated for the first time on national television. The Seattle Times called the first gubernatorial debate "more entertaining than informative", noting that candidates "didn't bother to wait for recognition by the moderator [or each other]." Rosellini showed "flashes of hot temper", while Andrews accused the incumbent governor of never attempting to balance the budget despite claims of effort. Both candidates addressed the state's troubled public school system and budgetary problems, the latter of which Andrews argued was caused by Rosellini's spending, as well as pay increases for teachers. After the debate, Andrews criticized the debate's format and rules, and asked that candidates be asked the same questions and limit rebuttals.

The second televised debate, on October 25, focused on taxation and fixing issues with the state-built Hood Canal Bridge. In a more subdued affair, candidates had limited rebuttals but continued to attack and denounce each other. Rosellini was accused by Andrews of attacking him directly after quoting Andrews' Republican primary opponent Newman H. Clark.

Results

Primary election

General election

References

Washington
1960
Gubernatorial
November 1960 events in the United States